Nadir Haddou (born 25 October 1983 in Issy les Moulineaux) is a French former professional road bicycle racer. He is the younger brother of cyclist Saïd Haddou.

Major results 

2009
 2nd Paris–Troyes
 3rd Grand Prix de la Somme
 9th Tro-Bro Léon
 9th Overall Ronde de l'Oise
2010
 1st Stage 2 Ronde de l'Oise
 4th Paris–Troyes
 8th Grand Prix de la Ville de Lillers
 9th Paris–Bourges

External links

French male cyclists
1983 births
Living people
People from Issy-les-Moulineaux
Sportspeople from Hauts-de-Seine
Cyclists from Île-de-France
French sportspeople of Algerian descent